Symphyotrichum ciliatum is a species of flowering plant in the family Asteraceae native to North America and eastern Eurasia. Each flower head has many whitish then pink disk florets and no ray florets ("rayless").

Conservation
, NatureServe listed  as Secure (G5) globally; Secure (S5) in Nebraska; Apparently Secure (S4) in Alberta, British Columbia, Manitoba, Northwest Territories, Saskatchewan, and Montana; Vulnerable (S3) in  Nunavut and Ontario; Imperiled (S2) in Wyoming; Critically Imperiled (S1) in Yukon; and, Possibly Extirpated (SH) in Kansas, Missouri, and Oklahoma.

Gallery

Citations

References

ciliatum
Flora of Canada
Flora of the United States 
Flora of Central Asia
Flora of Siberia
Flora of North-Central China
Flora of Southeast China
Flora of Manchuria
Flora of Mongolia
Plants described in 1833
Taxa named by Carl Friedrich von Ledebour